Graphium rhesus is a butterfly found in the Sunda Islands of the Malay Archipelago that belongs to the swallowtail family.

Subspecies
G. r. rhesus (northern and eastern Sulawesi)
G. r. rhesulus Fruhstorfer, 1902 (southern Sulawesi, Banggai)
G. r. rhaphia Jordan, 1908 (Tanahdjampea, Tukangbesi Islands)
G. r. parvimacula (Joicey & Talbot, 1922) (Sula Islands)

References

FuNet

External links
External images

Butterflies described in 1836
Pathysa
Butterflies of Indochina
Taxa named by Jean Baptiste Boisduval